The M1921 Browning machine gun was a water-cooled .50-caliber (12.7 mm) machine gun, designed by John Moses Browning, which entered production in 1929.

From 1917 to 1918, he developed the prototype Browning Winchester Cal.50 caliber heavy machine gun. It was developed from a water-cooled .30 caliber M1917 Browning machine gun.

History 
Machine guns were heavily used in World War I, and weapons of larger than rifle caliber began appearing on both sides of the conflict. The larger rounds were needed to defeat the armor that was being introduced to the battlefield, both on the ground and in the air. During World War I, the Germans introduced a heavily armored airplane, the Junkers J.I. The armor made aircraft machine guns using conventional rifle ammunition (such as the .30-06) ineffective.

Consequently, the American Expeditionary Force's commander General John J. Pershing asked for a larger caliber machine gun. Pershing asked the Army Ordnance Department to develop a machine gun with a caliber of at least  and a muzzle velocity of at least . U.S. Col. John Henry Parker, commanding a machine gun school in France, observed the effectiveness of a French  Gras incendiary round, the so-called balloon buster. The Army Ordnance Department ordered eight experimental Colt machine guns rechambered for the French 11 mm cartridge. The French 11 mm round was found to be unsuitable because its velocity was too low. Development with the French round was dropped.

Around July 1917, John M. Browning started redesigning his .30-06 M1917 machine gun for a larger and more powerful round. Winchester worked on the cartridge, which was a scaled-up version of the .30-06. Winchester initially added a rim to the cartridge because the company wanted to use the cartridge in an anti-tank rifle, but Pershing insisted the cartridge be rimless. In order to adapt his machine gun to .50 cal Browning had to introduce a proper hydraulic recoil buffer instead of a cheaper stack of fiber disks on .30-cal M1917 and M1919 which he also tried on the M1921, as well as breech block cushioning.

The first .50 caliber machine gun underwent trials on 15 October 1918. It fired at less than 500 rounds per minute, and the muzzle velocity was only . Cartridge improvements were promised. The gun was heavy, difficult to control, fired too slowly for the anti-personnel role, and was not powerful enough against armor.

While the .50 caliber was being developed, some German T Gewehr 1918 anti-tank rifles and ammunition were seized. Winchester improved the .50 caliber round to have similar performance.

Both the US Army and the US Navy adopted the M1921 after World War I, using it mostly as a static anti-aircraft weapon due to its  weight.

A slightly improved version, the M1921A1, was introduced in 1930 with all of the M1921s being upgraded. The gun was mounted on a pedestal mount with three horizontal legs. It had a 500-650 rounds per minute rate of fire.

Development continued and the M1921A1 was replaced by the water-cooled .50-caliber M2 Browning in 1933.  Ground and aircraft air-cooled versions of the M2 were also adopted in 1934.

See also
 List of crew-served weapons of the U.S. Armed Forces
 List of individual weapons of the U.S. Armed Forces
 List of U.S. Army weapons by supply catalog designation
 M2 Browning
 .50 BMG
 MG 18 TuF

References

General bibliography 
 

.50 BMG machine guns
Machine guns of the United States
Military equipment introduced in the 1920s
Weapons and ammunition introduced in 1921